Tracy Cortez (born December 10, 1993) is an American mixed martial artist who competes in the flyweight division of the Ultimate Fighting Championship. As of March 7, 2023, she is #14 in the UFC women's flyweight rankings.

Background 
Of Mexican descent, Cortez was born in Phoenix, Arizona, United States, and grew up in a household of Mexican immigrants. She has three brothers, Jose Cortez, J.R. Cortez and Abraham Cortez.  At the age of 14, she started training MMA after she watched her first MMA match where her oldest brother Jose, whose dream was to be a UFC fighter, fought against former UFC veteran Drew Fickett in November 2008. He won the fight via split decision. Jose stopped competing after the match with Fickett as he started to show cardiovascular problems and was later diagnosed  with germ cell cancer. He passed away from the cancer in 2011. Cortez got a tattoo in remembrance of her brother on her arm. She struggled through depression after her brother's passing but managed to get back on track with the help of her family and Henry Cejudo and Angel Cejudo, who are the best friends of her oldest brother Jose.

Mixed martial arts career

Early career 
Cortez fought under World Fighting Federation and KOTC in her amateur career and amassed a record of 3–0 prior to being signed by Invicta Fighting Championships.

Invicta Fighting Championships  and other promotions 

Cortez made her Invicta debut on August 31, 2017, against Cheri Muraski at Invicta FC 25: Kunitskaya vs. Pa'aluhi. She lost the fight via submission in round two.  She return to World Fighting in November 2017 fought against Roxanne Ceasear and secured a win via unanimous decision.

Her next fight came on March 24, 2018, facing Kaytlin Neil at Invicta FC 28: Mizuki vs. Jandiroba. She won the fight via unanimous decision. Cortez went on to face Monica Median and Karen Cedillo in 2018 at V3 Fight Night 69 and Combate Americas: Alday vs. Lopez respectively and she won both of the fights.

On February 15, 2019, Cortez faced Erin Blanchfield at Invicta FC 34: Porto vs. Gonzalez. She won the fight via split decision.

Dana White's Tuesday Night Contender Series 
Cortez appeared in DWTNCS: Season 3, Episode 6 web-series program on July 30, 2019, facing Mariya Agapova. She won the fight via unanimous decision and was signed by UFC.

Ultimate Fighting Championship
Cortez was expected to make her promotional debut against Duda Santana in a bantamweight bout on November 16, 2019, at UFC on ESPN+ 22. However, in October 27, it was reported that Santana was forced to withdraw from the fight due to family issues and she was replace by Vanessa Melo. At the weigh-ins, Cortez and Melo both missed weight for their fight, both weighing in at 136.5 pounds, 0.5 pounds over the bantamweight non-title fight limit of 136. The bout was initially proceeded at a catchweight and no fine was issued due to identical misses. However, later on the same day, Brazil's athletic commission (CABMMA) executive director Cristiano Sampaio announced that due to an error of the scale used at the weight-ins was set was 0.7 pounds above the official scale and thus both fighters were officially clear from missing weight and the bout proceeded at bantamweight. Cortez won the bout by unanimous decision.

Cortez was expected to face Bea Malecki on  October 11, 2020 at UFC Fight Night 179. However, on October 2, 2020, it was announced that Malecki was replaced by a newcomer Stephanie Egger for undisclosed reason. Cortez won the fight via unanimous decision.

Cortez faced Justine Kish on April 17, 2021, at UFC on ESPN 22. At the weigh-ins, Cortez came in at 126.5 pounds, a half pound over the flyweight non-title fight limit. Her bout proceeded at catchweight and she was fined 20% of her individual purse, which went to her opponent Kish. Cortez won the fight via a split decision.

Cortez was scheduled to face JJ Aldrich on August 28, 2021, at UFC on ESPN 30. However, Cortez was pulled from the fight due to injury, and she was replaced by Vanessa Demopoulos.

Cortez faced Melissa Gatto on May 7, 2022 at UFC 274. She won the fight via unanimous decision.

Cortez was scheduled to face Amanda Ribas on December 3, 2022 at UFC on ESPN 42. However, shortly after the official weigh-ins, the promotion announced Cortez was pulled from the bout due to an unspecified medical issue and the bout was cancelled.

Personal life
Cortez is engaged to fellow UFC fighter Brian Ortega.

Mixed martial arts record 

|-
|Win
|align=center|10–1
|Melissa Gatto
|Decision (unanimous)
|UFC 274
|
|align=center|3
|align=center|5:00
|Phoenix, Arizona, United States
|
|-
|Win
|align=center|9–1
|Justine Kish
|Decision (split)
|UFC on ESPN: Whittaker vs. Gastelum
|
|align=center|3
|align=center|5:00
|Las Vegas, Nevada, United States
|
|-
|Win
|align=center| 8–1
|Stephanie Egger
|Decision (unanimous)
|UFC Fight Night: Moraes vs. Sandhagen 
|
|align=center|3
|align=center|5:00
|Abu Dhabi, United Arab Emirates
|  
|-
|Win
|align=center| 7–1
|Vanessa Melo
|Decision (unanimous)
|UFC Fight Night: Błachowicz vs. Jacaré 
|
|align=center|3
|align=center|5:00
|São Paulo, Brazil
|
|-
| Win
| align=center| 6–1
| Mariya Agapova 
| Decision (unanimous)
| Dana White's Contender Series 22
| 
| align=center| 3
| align=center| 5:00
| Las Vegas, Nevada, United States
|
|-
| Win
| align=center| 5–1
| Erin Blanchfield
| Decision (split)
| Invicta FC 34: Porto vs. Gonzalez
| 
| align=center| 3
| align=center| 5:00
| Kansas City, Missouri, United States
|
|-
| Win
| align=center| 4–1
| Karen Cedillo
| TKO (punches)
| Combate Americas: Alday vs. Lopez
| 
| align=center| 2
| align=center| 3:53
| Phoenix, Arizona, United States
|
|-
| Win
| align=center| 3–1
| Monica Medina
| Submission (rear-naked choke)
| V3 Fights 69
| 
| align=center| 1
| align=center| 4:27
| Memphis, Tennessee, United States
|
|-
| Win
| align=center| 2–1
| Kaytlin Neil
| Decision (unanimous)
| Invicta FC 28: Mizuki vs. Jandiroba
| 
| align=center| 3
| align=center| 5:00
| Salt Lake City, Utah, United States
|
|-
| Win
| align=center| 1–1
| Roxanne Ceasear
| Decision (unanimous)
| World Fighting Federation 36
| 
| align=center| 3
| align=center| 5:00
| Chandler, Arizona, United States
|
|-
| Loss
| align=center| 0–1
| Cheri Muraski
| Submission (guillotine choke)
| Invicta FC 25: Kunitskaya vs. Pa'aluhi
| 
| align=center| 2
| align=center| 2:42
| Lemoore, California, United States
|
|-

See also 
 List of current UFC fighters

References

External links 
 
 

Living people
1993 births
American female mixed martial artists
Flyweight mixed martial artists
Mixed martial artists utilizing Brazilian jiu-jitsu
American practitioners of Brazilian jiu-jitsu
Female Brazilian jiu-jitsu practitioners
Ultimate Fighting Championship female fighters
Sportspeople from Phoenix, Arizona
Mixed martial artists from Arizona
American mixed martial artists of Mexican descent
21st-century American women